Lasham is a village and civil parish in the East Hampshire district of Hampshire, England. Lasham formerly had its own railway station, Bentworth and Lasham, on the Basingstoke and Alton Light Railway until the line's closure in 1936. According to the 2011 census, the village had a population of 176.

History
The village name has been spelled in various ways, including Esseham (11th century), Lessham (12th century), and Lesseham or Lassham (14th century). Lasham was first mentioned in the Domesday Survey of 1086 by William I (the conqueror) as an alod, and was then assessed at two and a half hides.

The Royal Navy used the village name for a Ham class minesweeper, HMS Lasham, which was operational from 1954 to 1981.

Lasham Airfield

Lasham Airfield was constructed in 1942 on high ground north of the village.  An avenue of beech trees that was originally planted by George Jervoise in 1809 was partially cut down to make way for the north side of the airfield, and the road running east–west just north of the airfield is still called "Avenue Road".

The Basingstoke–Alton road used to pass through Lasham village but as the land to the north was needed for the west end of the main runway, the road between  the Avenue and Lasham village was diverted to the west on lower ground and now by-passes the village, passing between Lasham and Bentworth just west of the old railway station.  This road was made of large concrete "sets" and was built by Italian prisoners of war who were housed in a camp at Thedden Grange southwest of Bentworth.

The airfield is now a major centre for the sport of gliding and is owned by Lasham Gliding Society, which bought the land from the Ministry of Defence. The airfield is also used by a company called ATC Lasham Ltd, which services airliners, mainly made by Boeing, in hangars on the south side of the main runway.

Highfield Site
This is a small group of business units on the road running north east from the church to Avenue Road, just outside the houses of the village proper.

Lasham parish
The church of St Mary, Lasham (CofE), was constructed in 1866 on the site of an older church, some of which went back to Saxon times.

The current Lasham parish boundary  is Avenue Road to the north, the A339 to the west and south (except for a small extension west to Spain Lane towards Burkham, and a line to the east between Lasham and Shalden.

Previously, for some 200 years, Lasham was part of the Herriard Park estate  (which still exists today to the north of the parish).  The villages of Herriard and Lasham used to have the same rector, the rectory being in Lasham.  Today Lasham is part of a larger CofE benefice which includes the villages of Bentworth, Lasham, Medstead and Shalden, the Rector living in Medstead.

Avenue Road.  An avenue of beech trees was planted in 1809 by George Purefoy Jervoise MP, to commemorate the golden jubilee of King George III in 1810.  The original avenue was one mile long but in 1942 when Lasham Airfield was constructed, some of the avenue was cut down.  When the plans became known, Sir George Jeffreys MP wrote a letter of objection which was published in the London Times newspaper on 7 October 1941.  The Jervoise family continue to own the land to the north of the airfield today.

Transport links
The village was formerly served by the Bentworth and Lasham railway station on the Basingstoke and Alton Light Railway, until its closure to passenger traffic in 1932.

Today, the A339 Alton-Basingstoke road runs to the west of the village and the B3349 Alton-Odiham road to the east.  Avenue Road, mentioned above and running on the north side of Lasham Airfield, connects the A339 to the B3349 at the Golden Pot public house at the top of the hill between Alton and Odiham.

Geography

Lasham and surrounding villages

References

External links

Hampshire County Council site for Lasham
 Lasham
 Lasham
 Listed Buildings in Lasham, Hampshire, England
 Stained Glass Windows at St. Mary, Lasham, Hampshire

Villages in Hampshire